Zvonimir Đurkinjak (born 2 June 1988) is a Croatian badminton player who plays for the Medvedgrad 1998 badminton club.

Career 
Đurkinjak started playing badminton when he was 10. At the Croatian National Badminton Championships he won the men's singles and mixed doubles title nine times from 2005, and eight times in the men's doubles event from 2004. He won gold medal at the Mersin 2013 Mediterranean Games in the men's doubles event partnered with Zvonimir Hölbling. In 2015, he competed at the European Games in the men's singles and doubles event.

Achievements

Mediterranean Games 
Men's doubles

BWF International Challenge/Series 
Men's singles

Men's doubles

Mixed doubles

  BWF International Challenge tournament
  BWF International Series tournament
  BWF Future Series tournament

National championships 
 2004 – men's doubles with Luka Zdenjak
 2005 – mixed doubles with Andrea Žvorc
 2006 – men's doubles with Luka Zdenjak & mixed doubles with Staša Poznanović
 2007 – men's singles, men's doubles with Luka Zdenjak & mixed doubles with Staša Poznanović
 2008 – men's doubles with Luka Zdenjak & mixed doubles with Staša Poznanović
 2009 – men's singles
 2010 – men's singles & mixed doubles with Staša Poznanović
 2011 – men's singles & mixed doubles with Staša Poznanović
 2012 – men's singles & mixed doubles with Staša Poznanović
 2013 – men's singles, men's doubles with Filip Špoljarec & mixed doubles with Staša Poznanović
 2014 – men's singles, men's doubles with Filip Špoljarec & mixed doubles with Matea Čiča
 2015 – men's singles & men's doubles with Filip Špoljarec
 2016 – men's singles & men's doubles with Filip Špoljarec

References

External links 
 

Croatian male badminton players
1988 births
Living people
Sportspeople from Zagreb
Badminton players at the 2015 European Games
Badminton players at the 2019 European Games
European Games competitors for Croatia
Competitors at the 2013 Mediterranean Games
Mediterranean Games gold medalists for Croatia
Mediterranean Games medalists in badminton
21st-century Croatian people